Brachydactyly (Greek βραχύς = "short" plus δάκτυλος = "finger"), is a medical term which literally means "short finger". The shortness is relative to the length of other long bones and other parts of the body. Brachydactyly is an inherited, dominant trait. It most often occurs as an isolated dysmelia, but can also occur with other anomalies as part of many congenital syndromes. Brachydactyly may also be a signal that one is at risk for congenital heart disease due to the association between congenital heart disease and carpenter's syndrome and the link between carpenter's syndrome and brachydactyly

Nomograms for normal values of finger length as a ratio to other body measurements have been published. In clinical genetics, the most commonly used index of digit length is the dimensionless ratio of the length of the third (middle) finger to the hand length. Both are expressed in the same units (centimeters, for example) and are measured in an open hand from the fingertip to the principal creases where the finger joins the palm and where the palm joins the wrist.

Causes 
Generally, brachydactyly is inherited through an autosomal dominant trait (The exact gene may differ see "Types" table for specific genes). However exceptions could exist due to antiepileptic medicines taken during pregnancy or low blood flow to the extremities during infancy.

Symptoms 
Symptoms of isolated brachydactyly include shorter bones in the hands and feet. This could include, phalanges, metacarpals, metatarsals, carpals, and tarsals. Different types of isolated brachydactyly have different symptoms and they are grouped according to what areas they affect.

Prognosis 
Isolated brachydactyly does not affect the wellbeing nor longevity of one's life, in most cases treatment is not necessary. The trait is primarily a cosmetic one and does not, in most cases, affect function of the hands and feet. Even left untreated and affecting function the general diagnosis of brachydactyly does not impact life expectancy. Prognosis may differ with different types or syndromes. ie. Brachydactyly-mesomelia-intellectual disability-heart defects syndrome or if brachydactyly is not isolated and is a part of a larger genetic condition. In rare cases of isolated untreated brachydactyly, simple functions like walking or grabbing things may be difficult reducing the overall quality of life.

Treatment 
Treatment is only needed if brachydactyly affects the function of the phalanges. In rare cases where function is affected, reconstructive surgery is used to improve function and the ability to use one's phalanges. Another treatment includes cosmetic surgery (Which is often confused with reconstructive surgery but differs in that cosmetic surgery may not be seen as medically necessary while reconstructive is.) to improve the way the affected areas appear.

Diagnosis 
Brachydactyly is usually diagnosed through anthropometric, clinical, or radiological methods. It is usually found early during infancy or in childhood years when the size difference becomes noticeable. It normally gets diagnosed as the difference in phalange size becomes more apparent. Healthcare providers complete a medical history, physical exam of your symptoms and use radiographs (X-rays). The X-rays show whether certain bones are shorter than others or shorter than they are supposed to be. Along with these steps the healthcare provider may conduct a genetic test. This could be to see if the disorder runs in the family and has been passed down or to identify the defective gene.

Epidemiology 
Most isolated forms of brachydactyly are considered rare (rare diseases are classified as affecting less than 200,000 people.) There are two exceptions: Type A3 and Type D which are considered common, affecting around 2% of the population Particularly high prevalence of Type D was reported among Israeli Arabs and in the Japanese population Type A3 was found at an especially high frequency of 21% among Japanese schoolchildren.

Types
There are several types of brachydactyly:

Other syndromes 
In the above brachydactyly syndromes, short digits are the most prominent of the anomalies, but in many other syndromes (Down syndrome, Rubinstein–Taybi syndrome, etc.), brachydactyly is a minor feature compared to the other anomalies or problems comprising the syndrome.

See also 
 Hypertension and brachydactyly syndrome
 Thumb stiffness-brachydactyly-intellectual disability syndrome
 Clubbed thumb
 Syndactyly

References

External links 

 Type A2
 
 
 
 
 
 
 
 
 

Congenital disorders of musculoskeletal system